Bryant Bank is a community bank in the U.S. state of Alabama.

History
Bryant Bank was founded by Paul W. Bryant, Jr. in 2005. He serves as its Chairman.

It has branches in Tuscaloosa, Northport, Birmingham, Mountain Brook, Trussville, Columbiana, Hoover, Foley, Daphne, and Huntsville.

The bank has $1.4 billion of assets under management in 2016.

References

Banks based in Alabama
Banks established in 2005
Companies based in Tuscaloosa, Alabama

2005 establishments in Alabama
Companies established in 2005